Flight 538 may refer to:

Trans Australia Airlines Flight 538, crashed on 10 June 1960
Lion Air Flight 538, crashed on 30 November 2004

0538